Brown Field is a 5,000-seat multi-purpose stadium in Valparaiso, Indiana. It is home to the Valparaiso University football and women's soccer teams. It also hosts track meets. It previously hosted the men's soccer and baseball teams. The facility opened in 1919.  It has hosted 9 Conference Championship Teams (1945, 1951, 1952, 1954, 1964, 1968, 1969, 2000 and 2003).

See also
 List of NCAA Division I FCS football stadiums

References

College football venues
College soccer venues in the United States
College track and field venues in the United States
Multi-purpose stadiums in the United States
Valparaiso Beacons football
Valparaiso Crusaders men's soccer
American football venues in Indiana
Athletics (track and field) venues in Indiana
Soccer venues in Indiana
Buildings and structures in Valparaiso, Indiana
Baseball venues in Indiana